Nguyễn Nhân Chiến (born 20 February 1960, in Bắc Ninh Province) is the Secretary of the Party Committee in Bắc Ninh province. He was a member of the 12th Central Committee.

References

1960 births
Living people
People from Bắc Ninh province
Communist Party of Vietnam politicians
Members of the 12th Central Committee of the Communist Party of Vietnam